Tsaft (Tarifit: Tsaft, ⵜⵙⴰⴼⵜ; Arabic: تسافت) is a commune in Driouch Province of the Oriental administrative region of Morocco. At the time of the 2004 census, the commune had a total population of 10,284 people living in 1786 households.

References

Populated places in Driouch Province
Rural communes of Oriental (Morocco)